Ēriks Koņeckis (9 February 1920 – 2 February 2006) was a Latvian ice hockey player. He played the World Championships for Latvia in 1938. After World War II and occupation of Latvia, Koņeckis played in Germany for Augsburg, Krefeld and Mannheim.

References

External links

1920 births
2006 deaths
Adler Mannheim players
Augsburger Panther players
Krefeld Pinguine players
Latvian ice hockey forwards
Ice hockey people from Riga
Latvian ice hockey defencemen
Latvian emigrants to Germany
West German ice hockey forwards
West German ice hockey defencemen
Latvian ice hockey coaches
West German ice hockey coaches